Yunyan may refer to the following locations in China:

Yunyan District (云岩区), Guiyang
Yunyan Pagoda (云岩寺塔), Chinese pagoda in Suzhou
Yunyan, Lechang (云岩镇), town in Guangdong